Heimdall or Heimdallr, is a god in Norse mythology.

Heimdall may also refer to:

Crater
 Heimdall (Callistoan crater), a crater on Callisto

Fiction
 Heimdall (comics), a comic book character based on the god
 Heimdall, an Asgard character in Stargate SG-1
 Heimdall (The Hitchhiker's Guide to the Galaxy), a character in And Another Thing... by Eoin Colfer
 Heimdall, a character in the anime and manga The Mythical Detective Loki Ragnarok

Video games
 Heimdall (video game), 1991
 Heimdall 2, the 1994 sequel
 Heimdall, a fictional aircraft carrier in Carrier
 Heimdallr, a fictional city featured in the Trails series

Computer software
 Heimdall (software), a software used for flashing and debugging Android handsets and tablets made by South Korean manufacturer Samsung

See also 
Heimdal (disambiguation)